Here Comes the Flood may refer to:

 "Here Comes the Flood", an episode of Grey's Anatomy (season 5)
 "Here Comes the Flood", a song by Peter Gabriel and Robert Fripp on the album Peter Gabriel (1977 album)
 a different version of the same song on the album Exposure (Robert Fripp album)
 "Here Comes the Flood", a song by the Divine Comedy on the album Fin de Siècle